Blok Dobryszyce  is a village in the administrative district of Gmina Dobryszyce, within Radomsko County, Łódź Voivodeship, in central Poland.

The village has an approximate population of 1,250.

References

Blok Dobryszyce